Rantauprapat is a town in North Sumatra province of Indonesia and it is the seat (capital) of Labuhan Batu Regency. Rantauprapat is also a village within the district of Rantau Utara (North Rantau). It consists of 3 main roads. A number of citizens move to larger cities like Medan in search for more job opportunities and/or universities. A large river named the Bilah River runs through the town, which had 140,778 inhabitants at the 2010 Census, 170,462 at the 2020 Census, and 172,862 according to the official estimates as at mid 2021.

Administration 
Rantauprapat was formerly an independent city situated within but administratively separate from Labuhan Batu Regency, but in 2003 its status of administrative city was erased as it did not fulfill the requirements, and it was merged into the Regency, within which it now comprises two districts (North Rantau and South Rantau). These two districts (kecamatan) are tabulated below with their areas and their populations at the 2010 Census  and 2020 Census, and the mid 2021 official estimates.

Climate
Rantauprapat has a tropical rainforest climate (Af) with heavy to very heavy rainfall year-round.

References

Populated places in North Sumatra
Regency seats of North Sumatra